Clog Dance may refer to:

 Clogging, traditional European folk dance
 Clog Dance (song), first single released by Violinski
 Clog Dance: The Very Best of Violinski, album by Violinski
 The Clog Dance, featured in the ballet La fille mal gardée by Ferdinand Hérold

See also
 Clog (disambiguation)